Oh Aaron is the third studio album by American teen pop singer Aaron Carter, released in the summer of 2001 through Jive Records. The album features three collaborations with No Secrets and his older brother, Nick Carter. Despite being not as successful as his second album, it found success in the US, peaking at number seven and was certified Platinum by the RIAA making this Aaron's second top 10 album and second platinum-selling album. This album was also his second album that was released under Jive Records.

Oh Aaron was accompanied by a concert DVD of the same name, which was released on March 26, 2002, and included footage of his 2001 concert in Baton Rouge, Louisiana, as well as music videos and interviews.

Play Along Toys also created an Aaron Carter action figure in conjunction with the album's release.

Singles
"Oh Aaron": is the title song and first single from Aaron Carter's third album "Oh Aaron". It features his older brother Nick Carter of the Backstreet Boys and pop girl group No Secrets. The song talks about Aaron getting tickets to a Backstreet Boys concert. The music video was filmed in Toronto. In the video, Aaron promises his friends (and parents and their friends) tickets to the Backstreet Boys concert, thinking Nick would hook him up. Nick agrees to at first, but when Aaron states that is 3,003 tickets, Nick disagrees. After some short begging, Nick agrees to—only if Aaron raps at his concert. Aaron later gets chased by fans on his way to the concert. He begs Nick to make him stay inside, but Nick carries him outside. At the end, Aaron is carried by tons of his fans. No Secrets sings the chorus of the song in different locations.
"Not Too Young, Not Too Old"
"I'm All About You": the third and final single of the album. In the video, Aaron is dancing and singing the song in a room. In a couple sub-plots, Aaron is sitting with a girl eating dinner, in a limousine, and enters a nightclub. The video can be seen on the Oh Aaron: Live In Concert DVD.

Critical reception

AllMusic's Stephen Thomas Erlewine commended Carter's voice for sounding less childish but criticized his performance of kid-friendly songs with adolescent overtones and sexual themes, and the producers for utilizing "cut and paste commercialism" with various genres throughout the track listing, saying it comes across as "disturbing pandering". Beth Johnson from Entertainment Weekly said about the record, "Preteens across the country can rejoice: 13-year-old cutie-pie Aaron Carter has released his second sing-along album in less than a year. Apparently A.C. (as he name-checks himself) knows what his fans like: cheery BSB/’N Sync-style raps, puppy-love ballads, and songs with "You" in the title (there are four of them). As harmless (for kids) as it is unlistenable (for adults)."

In their look at the Least Essential Albums of 2001, The A.V. Club awarded Oh Aaron the title of Least Essential Awkward Adolescence, with Stephen Thompson saying, "[A]ppearing to have aged about five years since 2000's Aaron's Party (Come Get It) and now possessing a voice that's gone from chirpy to unsure, the singer/rapper seems ill-suited for inching his way into artistic relevance as he begins to sprout facial hair and think about muscle cars."

Track listing

Notes
"Stride (Jump on the Fizzy)" contains a sample from "Break My Stride" written by Matthew Wilder and Greg Prestopino.
The Australian edition includes two bonus tracks before the interview with Aaron as tracks 11 and 12, "Get Up on Ya Feet" and "One for the Summer". 
The Korean edition of the album included only "Get Up on Ya Feet". A Korean special edition included a bonus VCD with the music videos of "Oh Aaron", "Not Too Young, Not Too Old", "I'm All About You", and the song and music video for Aaron's promotional song featured in Jimmy Neutron: Boy Genius, "Leave It Up to Me". It also featured an interview with Aaron along with brother Nick, and a look behind the scenes of the filming of the video for "I'm All About You". "Come Follow Me" was featured in the extended trailer for Hey Arnold! The Movie.
Other Asian editions were special releases featuring most of the songs from Aaron's debut album as "bonus tracks". A similar concept was employed on an Eastern European edition, which featured several tracks from Aaron's Party (as well as a remix of the title track and another song from around the time, "Everybody Stand Up"), two songs from Aaron's debut, "Leave It Up to Me" from Jimmy Neutron and another song by Aaron's on the soundtrack, "A.C.'s Alien Nation". This edition contains several misspellings and what seem to be repeats of several tracks already on the album.

Personnel

Vocals
Aaron Carter – lead vocals (all tracks), background vocals (5, 7, 8)
No Secrets – background vocals
Andy Goldmark – additional vocals (1), background vocals (8)
Jennifer Karr – additional vocals (1, 3)
Brian Kierulf – additional vocals (1, 3)
Audrey Martells – additional vocals (1)
Josh Schwartz – additional vocals (1, 3), background vocals (5)
Stacy Smith – additional vocals (1, 3)
Nate "Billionheir" Butler – background vocals (8)
Taylur Davis – background vocals (2)
Marc Nelson – background vocals (7, 8)
Tony T – background vocals (6, 9)
Todd "Boogie" Terrell – background vocals (4, 10)
Dana Williams – background vocals (2)
Davida Williams – background vocals (2)

Instrumentation
Brian Kierulf – guitar
Josh Schwartz – guitar
Paul Gendler – guitar (6, 9)
Michael Thompson – guitar (7)
Blake Eiseman – guitar (10)
Mike Hartnett – bass (10)
Myles 'Mad Myles' Schneit – scratches (1, 3)

Production
Charles McCrorey – assistant engineer (1)
Rowie Nameri – assistant engineer (1, 2, 4, 8, 10)
John O'Mahony – assistant engineer (1, 3)
Jason Rankins – assistant engineer (2)
Rich Tapper – assistant engineer (4, 5, 7, 10)
Tony Zeller – assistant engineer (10)
Rich Travali – mixing (1, 3, 5, 7)
Chris Trevett – mixing (2, 4, 10)
Bob Kraushaar – mixing (6, 9)
Brian Kierulf – programming
Chaz Harper – mastering

Artwork
Nick Gamma – art direction and design
Robert Ascroft – photography

Charts

Weekly charts

Year-end charts

Certifications

References

2001 albums
Aaron Carter albums
Jive Records albums
Albums recorded at Chung King Studios
Albums recorded at Westlake Recording Studios